The Bahawalpur Stags was a Pakistani men's professional Twenty20 cricket team that competed in the Haier T20 League and was based in Bahawalpur, Punjab, Pakistan. The Stags played at the Bahawal Stadium.

History
The stags were established in the 2012–13 season.

References

External links 
Twenty 20 Record page for Bahawalpur Stags
Cricketarchive page for Bahawalpur Stags

Cricket clubs established in 2012
2012 establishments in Pakistan
Cricket teams in Pakistan
Stags